Abdu Katuntu (born 12 March 1965) is a Ugandan politician, lawyer currently serving as the Member of Parliament for Bugweri County, Bugweri District.

Early life and education 
Katuntu is a practising lawyer, having received a Bachelor of Law from Makerere University and a diploma of Law from the Law Development Centre.

Work experience and political career 
Katuntu is a former member of the Pan-African Parliament from Uganda and the Rapporteur of the Committee on Justice and Human Rights.

Katuntu worked for Kadaga and company advocates which is owned by Rebecca Kadaga.

He was a member of Forum for Democratic Change party until 2021. He served as the Shadow Attorney General in the Parliament of Uganda till 2018  and was replaced by Wilfred Niwagaba.

Katuntu was first elected into the parliament of Uganda in 2001.

He lost his parliamentary seat in the 2006 Ugandan general election to Kirunda Kivejinja but challenged the result, citing widespread malpractices. The court found that "during the campaign period and on polling day, there was wide-spread intimidation, and torture in Bugweri Constituency", biasing the result in favour of Kivejinja. Katuntu won the resulting by-election.

In the 2011 general elections, Katuntu was re-elected for another term in Parliament.

Katuntu served as the chairman on the  Parliamentary committee on Rules and Discipline. A committee that concluded that Francis Zaake was guilty of insulting Anita Among and hence removing him from the position of Parliamentary Commissioner.

Katuntu was a chaiperson for the parliamentary committee on Commissions Statutory Authorities and State Enterprise (COSASE). He was replaced by Mubarak Munyagwa in 2019.

Katuntu is known for recovering 47 billion Ugandan shillings recovery from rougue chinese road construction firms in 2016.

Katuntu headed the Parliament of Uganda's task force on Covid-19  where he was assisted by other five members of the parliament of Uganda. Members were tasked to assess the role of the private health players.

Controversies 
Katuntu was described by Yoweri Museveni as a poisonous mushroom who was out to suffocate government programmes as he addressed a rally at Busesa in Bugweri county.

Julius Galisonga, a candidate for Forum for democratic change in the 2021 general election, filed an election pentition against Katuntu at the Jinja high court accusing Katuntu for connving with the Uganda Electoral Commission to frustrate the rightful procedures of fairness of election activities execution. Katuntu had won the election with 17,813 votes while Galisonga had 9,074 votes.

See also 

Bugweri District
Kirunda Kivejinja
 Parliament of Uganda
List of members of the ninth Parliament of Uganda
List of members of the tenth Parliament of Uganda

References 

1965 births
Members of the Pan-African Parliament from Uganda
Living people
Forum for Democratic Change politicians
Members of the Parliament of Uganda
Law Development Centre alumni
Makerere University alumni
21st-century Ugandan politicians
People educated at Kiira College Butiki